St. John's Church is a historic Roman Catholic parish church located within the Archdiocese of Newark at 22-26 Mulberry Street in Newark, Essex County, New Jersey, United States.  St. John's Church is the state's third-oldest Catholic church.

History
In 1826 the congregation held its first meeting in the basement of Charles Durning's home. Construction of the current building began in 1827. Later renovations and additions took place throughout the 19th and 20th centuries and incorporated the original structure's walls. When the church was first built, it was the only Catholic church in northern New Jersey and was originally part of the Diocese of New York.  The church currently runs a soup kitchen, women's shelter, and art gallery for children. The building was added to the National Register of Historic Places in 1972.

See also 
 National Register of Historic Places listings in Essex County, New Jersey

References

Roman Catholic churches in Newark, New Jersey
Churches on the National Register of Historic Places in New Jersey
Roman Catholic churches completed in 1827
19th-century Roman Catholic church buildings in the United States
Roman Catholic churches in New Jersey
National Register of Historic Places in Newark, New Jersey
New Jersey Register of Historic Places
1826 establishments in New Jersey